The Felinae are a subfamily of the family Felidae. This subfamily comprises the small cats having a bony hyoid, because of which they are able to purr but not roar.

Other authors have proposed an alternative definition for this subfamily: as comprising only the living conical-toothed cat genera with two tribes, the Felini and Pantherini; thus excluding all fossil cat species.

Characteristics
The members of the Felinae have retractile claws that are protected by at least one cutaneous lobe. Their larynx is kept close to the base of the skull by an ossified hyoid.
The cheetah Acinonyx does not have cutaneous sheaths for guarding claws.

Taxonomy
The term 'Felini' was first used in 1817 by Gotthelf Fischer von Waldheim, at the time for all the cat species that had been proposed as belonging to the genus Felis.
In 1917, Reginald Innes Pocock also subordinated the following genera to the Felinae that had been proposed in the course of the 19th century: Lynx, Puma, Leptailurus, Prionailurus, Pardofelis, Leopardus, Herpailurus, Neofelis and four more.

The Felinae and Pantherinae probably diverged about 11.5 million years ago. The genera within the Felinae diverged between 10.67 and 4.23 million years ago.

Today, the following living genera and species are recognised as belonging to the Felinae:

Extinct taxa

Phylogeny
The phylogenetic relationships of Felinae are shown in the following cladogram:

See also
 
 List of felids

References

External links
 
 

Felids
Taxa named by Gotthelf Fischer von Waldheim
Extant Miocene first appearances